Chipukizi F.C., or simply Chipukizi, is an association football club based in Zanzibar.

The team currently plays in the Zanzibar Premier League.

References

Football clubs in Tanzania
Zanzibari football clubs